Luo Wen-jia (Hakka: Lò Vùn-kâ; born 1 January 1966) is a Taiwanese politician. A member of the Democratic Progressive Party, Luo worked closely with Chen Shui-bian, first as Chen's legislative assistant, and later within Taipei City Government while Chen was mayor. When Chen was elected president in 2000, Luo joined the Executive Yuan as vice chairman of the Council of Cultural Affairs. Between 2002 and 2004, Luo was a member of the Legislative Yuan. He left the legislature for an appointment as head of the Council for Hakka Affairs, from which he stepped down in 2005 to run unsuccessfully for the Taipei County magistracy. Luo was subsequently defeated as a legislative candidate in 2008. Luo returned to politics in 2019, when he was named secretary-general of the Democratic Progressive Party.

Political career
Luo is a member of the Democratic Progressive Party (DPP), and served as legislative assistant to Chen Shui-bian between 1991 and 1994. After Chen was elected mayor of Taipei, Luo became the city government spokesman in December 1994. He left Taipei City Government in October 1997. Luo then served as spokesman for Chen Shui-bian's 2000 presidential campaign and in the same role for the Democratic Progressive Party.

After Chen became the president of the Republic of China, Luo held the vice chairmanship of the Council for Cultural Affairs. In January 2001, Luo resigned the post to prepare a bid for legislative elections later that year. He became one of five Democratic Progressive Party candidates to contest a seat from Taipei 1. During the election, the party urged its supporters to vote for candidates based on identification card numbers. Luo won election to the Legislative Yuan in December 2001. He was subsequently appointed as the chair of the Council for Hakka Affairs in 2004. He stepped down in March 2005 to contest a primary for the magistracy of Taipei County. The office was won by Chou Hsi-wei. During the 2008 legislative election cycle, Luo ended a bid for a party list seat in favor of a district seat, which he lost.

In January 2019, Luo ended his political retirement of nine years and accepted an appointment as secretary-general of the Democratic Progressive Party.

Political stances
In 2004, Luo, Chen Chi-mai, Lee Wen-chung and Tsai Huang-liang proposed New Culture Discourse, which argued that Taiwan was a multicultural society and that it should retain the Republic of China as the official name. Luo and Tuan Yi-kang launched the new DPP movement for party reform in 2005. Chen Shui-bian advised against the name, drawing parallels to the New Kuomintang Alliance, which later became the New Party.

Personal life
Luo is married to Liu Chao-yi.

References

Democratic Progressive Party Members of the Legislative Yuan
National Taiwan University alumni
1966 births
Living people
Politicians of the Republic of China on Taiwan from Taoyuan City
Members of the 5th Legislative Yuan
Taiwanese politicians of Hakka descent
Taipei Members of the Legislative Yuan